Squibs' Honeymoon is a 1923 British silent comedy film directed by George Pearson and starring Betty Balfour, Hugh E. Wright and Fred Groves. It was the last of the silent film series featuring the character, although Balfour returned to play her in the 1935 sound film Squibs. Both Pearson and Balfour were particular favourites of the British film critic, and later leading screenwriter, Roger Burford. In his first article for the magazine Close Up Burford would write "Not long ago a film of the Squibbs series was reported to be on at a small cinema in a slum district. It was a rare chance, and we went at once. We were not disappointed: the film was English, with proper tang; the tang of Fielding or Sterne.' Burford's comments help place the Squibbs films perfectly in British culture between the wars. They were very much working-class comedy, drawing on a vernacular, performative tradition, but at the same time their "Englishness" is characteristic of the kinds of satirical comedies found in the novels of Henry Fielding and Laurence Sterne. That earthy satire, based on everyday life, made these comedies unpalatable to middle class audiences but the Squibbs films were amongst the most interesting, and well shot, films in Britain in the 1920s.

Cast
 Betty Balfour as Squibs Hopkins 
 Hugh E. Wright as Sam Hopkins  
 Fred Groves as PC Charlie Lee  
 Frank Stanmore as Horace Honeybunn  
 Irene Tripod as Euphemia Fitzbulge  
 Robert Vallis as Bob  
 Maurice Redmund as Jean

References

Bibliography
 Low, Rachael. The History of the British Film 1918-1929. George Allen & Unwin, 1971.

External links
 
 
 Entry of film in Progressive Silm Film List
 Mention of film in History of British Film (Volume 4): The History of the British Film 1918 - 1929
 Mention of film in Movie History: A Survey: Second Edition

1923 films
1923 comedy films
British comedy films
British silent feature films
1920s English-language films
Films directed by George Pearson
British black-and-white films
1920s British films
Silent comedy films